London Pride most often refers to:
 London Pride (beer), a bitter brewed by Fuller, Smith and Turner
 Pride in London, London's annual LGBT pride festival and celebration, held during June and July

London Pride may also refer to:

Plants
Saxifraga × urbium, a flowering garden plant
Saxifraga cuneifolia, lesser Londonpride
Crassula multicava, Fairy Crassula

Other uses 
 London Pride Morris Men, founded in the 1930s, one of the earliest sides of the Morris Men dance revival, whose membership included Roy Judge
 London Pride Sightseeing, a former London tour company owned by Ensignbus operating open-top sightseeing buses in London
London Pride (film), a 1920 British silent film
London Pride (1896 novel), a novel by Mary Elizabeth Braddon
London Pride (novel), a 1941 novel by Phyllis Bottome
"London Pride" (song), a 1941 song written by Noël Coward during the Blitz of World War II
London Pride, one of several oil tankers built for London & Overseas Freighters in 1950, 1971, and 1993
London Pride (sculpture), by Frank Dobson,  on London's South Bank